Genocide and Mass Murder is the debut album by Japanese metal band Deathgaze. It was their final release featuring vocalist Sou. He left shortly after the release of the album. Only two-thousand copies of this album were pressed.

Track listing
 "Venom" – 1:48
 "Genocide and Mass Murder" – 4:29
 "Yami ni Ame Fukaishita Sekai." (闇に雨 腐敗した世界。) – 4:37
 "Grave" – 4:56
 "Proof" – 5:32
 "Dies Irae" (ディエスイレ) – 4:47
 "SxSxDxD" – 4:22
 "The Fist." – 3:03
 "Gethsemane" – 5:12
 "Miscarriage" – 4:57
 "Disease" – 4:45
 "Killing Floor" – 4:04
 "2940362204052" - 1:45
 "Mr. Freaks" - 4:58

A rerecording of "Venom" is featured on the "Dearest" single, while a rerecording of "Disease" appears on the "Insult Kiss Me" single.

Rerecordings of the songs "Yami ni Ame Fukaishita Sekai.", "Genocide and Mass Murder", "Dies Irae" and "2940362204052" appear on the bands rerecording album THE CONTINUATION.

Further rerecordings of "Miscarriage", "Killing Floor", "Proof", "Gethsemane", "Mr. Freaks" and "The Fist." appear on the limited edition-only bonus disc of the band's BLISS OUT album.

The songs "Yami ni Ame Fukaishita Sekai.", "Dies Irae", "The Fist." and "2940362204052" are re-recordings from the "2940362204052" single.

Deathgaze albums
2006 albums